The Serbia women's national ice hockey team is the women's national ice hockey team of Serbia. The team is controlled by the Serbian Ice Hockey Association, a member of the International Ice Hockey Federation.

History
The team first played in an international tournament at the 2022 IIHF Women's World Championship Division III, the lowest IIHF women's hockey tier.

World Championship record
2022 – Finished in 36th place (2nd in Division IIIB)

References

External links
Official website
IIHF profile
National Teams of Ice Hockey

Ice hockey
Women's national ice hockey teams in Europe